Elbert Carter Turner (September 11, 1901 – February 3, 1970), nicknamed "Cool" and "Pop", was an American Negro league infielder and umpire, and a college baseball coach at North Carolina College.

A native of Brooklyn, New York, Turner attended West Virginia State University, and was the school's starting quarterback. He began his Negro leagues career in 1921 while still in college, using the aliases "J.H. Wagner" and "Bert Wagner" to protect his amateur status. Turner played in the 1927 Colored World Series for the Bacharach Giants. Following his playing career, he went on to umpire in the Negro National League, and was head coach at North Carolina College. Turner died in Durham, North Carolina in 1970 at age 68.

References

External links
 and Baseball-Reference Black Baseball stats and Seamheads

1901 births
1970 deaths
Birmingham Black Barons players
Brooklyn Royal Giants players
Chicago American Giants players
Cleveland Cubs players
Hilldale Club players
Homestead Grays players
Lincoln Giants players
Sportspeople from Brooklyn
Baseball players from New York City
West Virginia State Yellow Jackets football players
American football quarterbacks
Baseball umpires
20th-century African-American sportspeople
Baseball infielders